John Grieve "Ian" Wilson (11 February 1923 – 5 November 1989) was a Scottish professional footballer who played as a winger.

Wilson started his career with Forfar Athletic before moving to England to join Preston North End in 1946. Wilson scored six goals in 16 league appearances before moving to Burnley in June 1948. He made his debut for the club in the 0–1 defeat to Portsmouth on 28 August 1948. In the 1–0 win against Everton on 2 October 1948, Wilson scored his only goal for Burnley. He played his 19th and last game for the club in the 1–2 loss away at Manchester United on 4 February 1950.

Wilson signed for Leicester City in March 1950 and scored twice in 12 league appearances before leaving to join Chesterfield the following year. He spent several years in lower-league football with Chesterfield and Rotherham United, before ending his career in semi-professional football with Boston United.

References

Sources

External links

1923 births
1989 deaths
Footballers from Fife
Scottish footballers
Association football wingers
Forfar Athletic F.C. players
Preston North End F.C. players
Burnley F.C. players
Leicester City F.C. players
Chesterfield F.C. players
Rotherham United F.C. players
Boston United F.C. players
English Football League players
Scottish emigrants to Canada
People from Kennoway